These are the results of the men's C-1 500 metres competition in canoeing at the 2004 Summer Olympics.  The C-1 event is raced by single-man sprint canoes.

Medalists

Heats
The 19 competitors first raced in three heats.  The first-place finishers from each of the heats advanced directly to the final, and the remaining 16 canoers moved on to the two semifinal races.  The heats were raced on August 24.

Semifinals
The top three finishers in each of the two semifinals qualified for the final, joining the three first-place finishers from the initial heats.  Fourth place and higher competitors were eliminated.  The semifinals were raced on August 26.

Final
The final was raced on August 28.

Dittmar learned his lesson from the previous day in letting Cal get out to far ahead in the C-1 1000 m event by staying close to the Spaniard through the entire race before winning his third Olympic gold medal.

References
2004 Summer Olympics Canoe sprint results 
Sports-reference.com 2004 C-1 500 m results.
Yahoo! Sports Athens 2004 Summer Olympics Canoe/Kayak Results
Wallcehinsky, David and Jaime Loucky (2008). "Canoeing: Men's Canadian Singles 500 Meters". In The Complete Book of the Olympics: 2008 Edition. London: Aurum Press Limited. p. 479.

Men's C-1 0500
Men's events at the 2004 Summer Olympics